Bob Bax (1925-2000) was an Australian rugby league footballer and coach. During the 1940s he played in the Brisbane Rugby League premiership as a half back for the Brothers club and also played for the Brisbane rugby league team in the Bulimba Cup. From 1956 to 1970 Bax coached Brothers and Norths, reaching 14 grand finals and taking nine premierships.

Bax inherited the coaching role at the Brisbane Rugby League's reigning premiers, Northern Suburbs RLFC from Clive Churchill in 1960 and won the premiership again that year. Norths then became the first club in BRL history to win three consecutive first grade premierships when they defeated Fortitude Valley 29–5 in the 1961 grand final in front of a record club crowd of 19,824 at Lang Park. Bax extended this record winning streak to six, claiming premierships again in 1962, 1963 and 1964. He coached the side to two more grand final wins in 1966 and 1969.

In 1971 Bax became the first coach to sign an Australian rules football player: Barry Spring, who was 26 and had never played a game of rugby league. Spring  frequently kicked field goals from anywhere within a 60-yard range, leading to a rule change, with two points for a field goal changing to one point in 1971.

In 1992 Bax was part of a six-man panel selected by Rugby League Week to name an all-time greatest team to celebrate rugby league in Australia's 85th year. Bob Bax's son, Robert Bax, operated the Brisbane law firm, Robert Bax and Associates. Bax died in 2000 at age 74 after a long illness and was buried in Nudgee Cemetery. The Norths Devils' award for "Player most likely to succeed" was named the Bob Bax Award in his honour. In 2008, the Norths clubs' 75th anniversary year, Bax was named as coach of their all-time greatest team.

References

1925 births
2000 deaths
Australian rugby league coaches
Australian rugby league players
Brisbane rugby league team players
Burials at Nudgee Cemetery
Norths Devils coaches
Past Brothers players
Queensland rugby league team coaches
Rugby league players from Brisbane
Sportsmen from Queensland